Factory leader was a term introduced by the Labour organization law of 20 January 1934 for the owner, entrepreneur or manager of a business or company. Factory leaders and their “followers” formed the “factory community”, replicating the national community in accordance with the leader principle. The term was also applied to owners and tenants of farms.

See also
German labour law
UK labour law

Notes

Economy of Nazi Germany